"That's All That Matters" is a song written by Hank Cochran, and recorded by American country music artist Ray Price in 1964.  It has been recorded by multiple other country artists but the most famous recording was done by American country music artist Mickey Gilley.  It was released in September 1980 as the first single and partial title track from his album That's All That Matters to Me.  The song was Gilley's tenth number one on the country charts.  The single went to number one for one week and spent a total of eleven weeks on the country chart.

Chart performance

References

1980 singles
Ray Price (musician) songs
Glen Campbell songs
Mickey Gilley songs
Songs written by Hank Cochran
Song recordings produced by Jim Ed Norman
Epic Records singles
1964 songs